Britannia landfill, now BraeBen Golf Course, and previously Britannia Hills Golf Course, was a garbage dump located in the city of Mississauga and later transformed into a golf course. The site is located on Terry Fox Way south of Britannia Road West.

Opened in 1980 by Peel Region, the  site took garbage from Peel and Metro Toronto. It closed in 2002 and was used to create a 27-hole golf course.

The City of Mississauga has a 99-year lease on the facility. Gases from the dump are to be used to generate electricity.

Other Greater Toronto Area landfills include:

 Beare Road Landfill in Toronto, Ontario
 Keele Valley Landfill in Vaughan, Ontario
 Brock Road Landfills in Pickering, Ontario

References
 Conrad Britannia Ppt
 Britannia Landfill Gas to Electricity Project

Landfills in Canada
History of Mississauga